The Men's Bantamweight Weightlifting Event (– 56 kg) is the second lightest men's event at the weightlifting competition, limiting competitors to a maximum of 56 kilograms of body mass.
Each weightlifter had three attempts for both the snatch and clean and jerk lifting methods. The total of the best successful lift of each method was used to determine the final rankings and medal winners. Competition took place on 21 July in the Izmailovo Sports Palace.

For third place there was a tie between Tadeusz Dembończyk and Andreas Letz as they both weighed 55.60 kg at the weigh-in and they both had a 265 kg total. They were re-weighed after the event, Dembończyk weighed 0.1 kg less than Letz and was awarded the bronze medal.

Results

New records

References 
 

Weightlifting at the 1980 Summer Olympics